"" is the national anthem of Chad. Written by Louis Gidrol and his student group and composed by Paul Villard, it has been the official state anthem of Chad since it gained independence from France in January 1960.

History 
The anthem was written, following a competition, by Jesuit father Louis Gidrol and his student group from the Saint Paul Boarding School in Fort-Archambault (the current city of Sarh). The music was composed by another Jesuit father, Paul Villard. It was adopted as the official state anthem of Chad upon gaining independence from France in January 1960.

Lyrics
The anthem comprises a chorus and four verses. Only the chorus and first verse constitute the official national anthem. The other three verses are barely known among young Chadians.

Notes

References

External links 
 Chad: "La Tchadienne" - Audio of the national anthem of Chad, with information and lyrics

National anthems
Chadian music
National symbols of Chad
African anthems
1960 songs
National anthem compositions in B-flat major